The yellow-billed magpie (Pica nuttalli), also known as the California magpie, is a large corvid that inhabits California's Central Valley and the adjacent chaparral foothills and mountains. Apart from its having a yellow bill and a yellow streak around the eye, it is virtually identical to the black-billed magpie (Pica hudsonia) found in much of the rest of North America. 
The scientific name commemorates the English naturalist Thomas Nuttall.

Taxonomy
mtDNA sequence analysis indicates a close relationship between the yellow-billed magpie and the black-billed magpie, rather than between the outwardly very similar black-billed and European magpies (P. pica).

The Korean subspecies of the European magpie (P. p. sericea) is more distantly related to all other (including North American) forms judging from the molecular evidence, and thus, either the North American forms are maintained as specifically distinct and the Korean (and possibly related) subspecies are also elevated to species status, or all magpies are considered to be subspecies of a single species, Pica pica.

Combining fossil evidence and paleobiogeographical considerations with the molecular data indicates that the yellow-billed magpie's ancestors became isolated in California quite soon after the ancestral magpies colonized North America (which probably happened some 3–4 mya) due to early ice ages and the ongoing uplift of the Sierra Nevada, but that during interglacials there occurred some gene flow between the yellow- and black-billed magpies until reproductive isolation was fully achieved in the Pleistocene.

The yellow-billed magpie is adapted to the hot summers of California's Central Valley and experiences less heat stress than the black-billed magpie.

Behaviour
The yellow-billed magpie is gregarious and roosts communally. There may be a cluster of communal roosts in one general area made up of a central roost containing many birds and several outlying roosts with fewer.

Yellow-billed magpie flocks are known to engage in funeral-like behavior for their dead. When a magpie dies, a gathering of them congregates around the deceased bird where they call out loudly for 10-15 minutes.

Breeding
The yellow-billed magpie prefers groves of tall trees along rivers and near open areas, though in some cities they have begun to nest in vacant lots and other weedy places. A pair of birds builds a dome-shaped nest with sticks and mud on a high branch. Nests may be 14 meters above the ground and are sometimes built far out on long branches to prevent predators from reaching them. They nest in small colonies, or occasionally alone. Even when nesting close to other birds they may exhibit some territorial behavior. These birds are permanent residents and do not usually wander far outside of their breeding range.

Extra-pair copulation is not uncommon among yellow-billed magpies. After mating, a male will exhibit mate-guarding, preventing the female from mating with other males until she lays the first egg. The clutch contains 5 to 7 eggs which are incubated by the female for 16 to 18 days. Both parents feed the nestlings a diet of mostly insects until fledging occurs in 30 days.

Food and feeding

These omnivorous birds forage on the ground, mainly eating insects, especially grasshoppers, but also carrion, acorns and fruit in fall and winter. They are attracted to recently butchered carcasses on farms and ranches. They pick through garbage at landfills and dumping sites, and sometimes hunt rodents.

Diseases
This bird is extremely susceptible to West Nile virus. Between 2004 and 2006 it is estimated that 50% of all yellow-billed magpies died of the virus. Because the bird tends to roost near water bodies such as rivers, it is often exposed to mosquitoes.

Conservation
The IUCN classifies the bird as a vulnerable species. The Nature Conservancy places it in the vulnerable category. Besides West Nile Virus, threats include loss of habitat and rodent poison. The bird has a limited area of distribution but is widespread throughout the area and still common in many places.

References

External links

Yellow-billed magpie photo gallery VIREO

yellow-billed magpie
Endemic birds of the Western United States
Fauna of the San Francisco Bay Area
Endemic fauna of California
yellow-billed magpie
yellow-billed magpie